The Singer Building was an early skyscraper in New York City.

Singer Building may also refer to:
Singer Building (Pasadena, California)
Singer Building (Chicago), a skyscraper
Singer Building (Dallas, Texas)

See also
Singer House, a building in Saint Petersburg, Russia
John F. Singer House, a historic house in Wilkinsburg, Pennsylvania